Dimitri Kirilov (born November 24, 1978 in Leningrad, Soviet Union) is a Russian professional boxer. Nicknamed "The Baby", he was former IBF super flyweight champion. He has a record of 31-7-1, with 10 wins by knockout.

On October 13, 2007, Kirilov defeated José Navarro by unanimous decision in twelve rounds to capture the vacant IBF super flyweight championship. The judges scored it 116-112, 114-113, and 114-113; the bout would have been a majority draw had Kirilov not downed Navarro in the third round.

On February 28, 2008, Kirilov managed to retain his IBF super flyweight title against Cecilio Santos as the match ended in majority draw.

On August 2, 2008, Kirilov lost his title to Vic Darchinyan, a former IBF flyweight champion, by 5th round KO.

References

External links 
 

1978 births
International Boxing Federation champions
Super-flyweight boxers
Living people
Russian male boxers